Elmar Kraushaar (born 11 August 1950) is a German journalist and author who lives in Berlin.

Biography 
Kraushaar was born in Niederurff in northern Hesse. He studied from 1971 to 1979 in Berlin at Free University of Berlin. In the 1970s, during his university studies, he joined the gay organisation Homosexuelle Aktion Westberlin.

As author Kraushaar began to write on LGBT topics, including some works with Matthias Frings.

Kraushaar has worked as a journalist for Germany's longest running LGBT periodical Siegessäule out of Berlin, for the newspaper die tageszeitung (taz), and for Der Spiegel. In 1990 Kraushaar became a journalist for RIAS TV, then worked at Deutsche Welle. His column Der homosexuelle Mann... has run in taz since 1995.

Works by Kraushaar, in German 

 Männer, Liebe – ein Handbuch für Schwule und alle, die es werden wollen. Reinbek, Rowohlt, 1982. 
 Rote Lippen – die ganze Welt des deutschen Schlagers. Reinbek, Rowohlt, 1983. 
 Die ungleichen Brüder. Zum Verhältnis zwischen schwulen und heterosexuellen Männern.  Rororo-Verlag, Reinbek 1988.  (together with Matthias T. J. Grimme)
 article - in: Detlef Grumbach (Ed.): Die Linke und ihr Laster – schwule Emanzipation und linke Vorurteile. Hamburg, MännerschwarmSkriptverlag, 1995. 
 Schwule Listen – Namen, Daten und Geschichten. Reinbek, Rowohlt, 1994. 
 Hundert Jahre schwul – eine Revue. Berlin, Rowohlt, 1997. 
 Der homosexuelle Mann … – Anmerkungen und Beobachtungen aus zwei Jahrzehnten. Hamburg, MännerschwarmSkriptverlag, 2004.

References

External links 
 Siegesaeule:Elmar Kraushaar

1950 births
Living people
People from Schwalm-Eder-Kreis
German journalists
German male journalists
German newspaper journalists
German gay writers
Free University of Berlin alumni
German LGBT journalists
Die Tageszeitung people
21st-century German journalists
20th-century German journalists